Kristjan Čujec (born 30 November 1988) is a Slovenian futsal player who plays for Dobovec as a forward.

References

External links
UEFA profile

1988 births
Living people
People from Šempeter pri Gorici
Slovenian men's futsal players
Slovenian expatriate sportspeople in Spain
Slovenian expatriate sportspeople in Italy
Slovenian expatriate sportspeople in Croatia
Caja Segovia FS players
Ribera Navarra FS players
Futsal forwards